Parliamentary elections were held in Ceylon in 1952. It is notable for being the second and final election overseen and administered by the Department of Parliamentary Elections before its merger in 1955.

Background
Prime Minister D.S. Senanayake died in March 1952, and was succeeded by his son, Dudley.  The national wave of mourning for Ceylon's first prime minister greatly boosted the UNP's fortunes.

The 1952 election was the first contested by the Sri Lanka Freedom Party, which had broken away from the UNP on a platform of Sinhala nationalism, and the Illankai Tamil Arasu Kachchi (Federal Party), which split from the All Ceylon Tamil Congress over joining the UNP government.

Results
Because the estate Tamils had been stripped of their citizenship by the Senanayake government, the Ceylon Indian Congress, which most of them had supported, was eliminated from Parliament and the Lanka Sama Samaja Party lost seats. The UNP won a majority, mainly at the cost of the CIC and the LSSP.

Notes

References

 
 
 
 

 
Ceylon
1952 in Ceylon
Parliamentary elections in Sri Lanka
May 1952 events in Asia
Election and referendum articles with incomplete results